Elisabeth Kulmann (- ) was a Russian-born poet and translator who worked in Russian, German and Italian.

Biography 
Kulmann was born in the Russian Empire, one of the several children of Boris Fedorovich, and Mary (née Rosenberg) Kulmann. Her father, a collegiate councilor and a retired captain, died early. The family lived on Vasilyevsky Island in St. Petersburg.

As a child, Kulman showed phenomenal philological abilities, learning ancient and modern languages under the direction of Karl Grosgeynrikh.  She achieved fluency in 11 languages.

Kulman wrote over 1,000 poems before her death at age 17. Robert Schumann considered her a wunderkind and set some of her poems to music including "Mailied" ["May Song"] and "An den Abendstern" ["To the Evening Star"].

Kulman was buried in the Smolensky Cemetery in St. Petersburg, in a tomb bearing a carving by Alexander Triscorni - a marble sculpture of a girl on a bed of roses. The monument bears inscriptions in several languages, including Latin: Prima Russicarum operam dedit idiomati graeco, undecim novit linguas, loquebatur octo, quamquam puella poetria eminens (The first Russian young girl, who knew the Greek language, and learned eleven languages, spoken in eight, and was an excellent poet).

In the 1930s, the Soviet authorities moved Kulman's remains to the Tikhvin Cemetery in the Alexander Nevsky monastery.

Selected works 
 Kulmann Elisabeth. Sämmtliche Gedichte — S.-Pb., 1835. — 200 S.
 Kulmann E. Saggi poetici. — S.-Pietroburgo, 1839. — XXIII, 191 S.
 Kulmann Elisabeth. Sämmtliche Gedichte — Leipzig, 1844. — 132; 288 S.
 Kulmann E. Saggi Poetici di Elisabetta Kulmann. — Milano, 1845, 1846, 1847.
 Kulmann Elisabeth. Sämmtliche Dichtungen — Frankfurt am Main, 1851. — CXXXIII, 670 S.; 1857. — CXXVIII, 724 S.
 Kulmann E. Dichtungen. Ausgewahlt und mit einer Einleitung versehen von Franz Miltner. — Heidelberg, 1875. — XXII, 145 S.
 Kulmann E. Mond, meiner Seele Liebling: e.Ausw. ihrer Gedichte. — Heidelberg, 1981.

Musical works in Kulmann verses 
 Schumann R. Mädchenlieder von Elisabeth Kulmann für 2 Sopran-St. jder Sopran u. Alt mit Begleitung des Pianoforte. Op. 103. — Leipzig: Fr. Kistner, [1851]. — 11 S.
 Schumann R. Sieben Lieder von Elisabeth Kulmann zur Erinnerung an die Dichterin für eine Singstimme mit Begleitung des Pianoforte componirt von Rob. Schumann. Op.104. — Leipzig: Fr. Kistner, [1851]. — 18 S.

References

Further reading 
 Münnich. Elisabeth Kulmann. Eine biographische Skizze. — Nürnberg, 1842.
 Karl Friedrich von Großheinrich: Elisabeth Kulmann und ihre Gedichte in: Sämmtliche Gedichte von Elisabeth Kulmann, herausgegeben von K. F. von Großheinrich. Fünfte vollständige Ausgabe. Leipzig: Wigand 1847.
 Lamprecht E. Elisabeth Kulmann. Biograph. Skizze. Mit Proben aus d. Gedichten. — Zwickau, 1867. — 76 S.
 Thompson E. Elisabeth Kulmann. — St. Petersburg, 1910. — 34 S.
 Gramlich I. Auf den Spuren eines Engels: Zum 175. Todestag der deutsch-russischen Dichterin Elisabeth Kulmann // Volk auf dem Weg: Verbandszeitung der Landsmannschaft der Deutschen aus Rußland (Stuttgart). — 2000. — Nr 8/9. — S. 42-45.
 Hansburg G. Aufsätze über Poetess Elisabeth Kulmann // Russland-Deutsche Zeitgeschichte unter Monarchie und Diktatur. — Bd. 4. — Fusgabe 2004/2005 / Hrsg. A. Bosch. — Nürnberg, München, Grußburgwedel, 2005. — S. 76—127. .
 Zhatkin D., Milotaeva O. E.B. Kulman’s Creative Work in the Context of the History of Russian Literature and Russian Poetic Translation // Mediterranean Journal of Social Sciences. – Vol 6. – №3. – May 2015. – P. 139-146.

External links 

 Elisabeth Kulmann (1808-1825)
 Elisabeth Kulmann verses
 3 Aphorismen und 6 Gedichte des Autors Elisabeth Kulmann
 

1808 births
1825 deaths
Poets from the Russian Empire
Translators from the Russian Empire
Russian people of German descent
Burials at Tikhvin Cemetery
19th-century translators from the Russian Empire